Uraba is a genus of moths of the family Nolidae erected by Francis Walker in 1863.

It has been considered a synonym of Roeselia.

Species
 Uraba deplanana Walker, 1866
 Uraba lugens Walker, 1863

References

Nolinae